Melchior Hubert Paul Gustav Graf von Hatzfeldt zu Wildenburg (8 October 1831 – 22 November 1901) was a German diplomat who served as ambassador to the United Kingdom from 1885 to 1901. He was also envoy to Spain and the Ottoman Empire, foreign secretary, and head of the Foreign Office. He is best known for signing the Yangtze Agreement in 1900.

Early life
Hatzfeldt was born in Düsseldorf, Kingdom of Prussia, a part of the German Confederation, on 8 October 1831. A member of the House of Hatzfeld, he was the son of Sophie von Hatzfeldt ( Gräfin von Hatzfeldt-Schönstein zu Trachenberg) and Edmund Fürst von Hatzfeldt-Wildenburg.

Career
Hatzfeldt had a long career in the German diplomatic office and was once described by Otto von Bismarck as das beste Pferd im diplomatischen Stall ("the best horse in the diplomatic stable"). He was Bismarck's secretary when he was Ambassador to Paris in 1862.

In 1874, he was appointed as German Ambassador to Spain in Madrid, followed by Ambassador to the Ottoman Empire, before he was recalled in 1881 to become foreign secretary and head of the Foreign Office. In 1885, he succeeded Count Münster as ambassador to United Kingdom until 1901, during which he signed the Yangtze Agreement in 1900. In 1897, it was reported that he would resign on account of ill-health, followed by similar reports in the years leading up to his actual retirement in November 1901, a few weeks before his death. He was succeeded by Count Paul Wolff Metternich. 

In his letter accepting Count von Hatzfeldt's request to retire, Emperor Wilhelm II wrote: "I feel impelled to express my imperial thanks for the excellent services which, during the forty-four years of your official life, you have rendered to my predecessors on the throne, to myself, and to the whole Fatherland." Upon his retirement, the Emperor bestowed on him the Order of Merit of the Prussian Crown as "a token of my good-will."

Personal life
Hatzfeldt was married to Helene Moulton (3 September 1846 – 9 April 1918), the daughter of New York real estate speculator Charles Frederick Moulton and Cesarinne Jeanne ( Metz) Moulton. They divorced in 1886, but were remarried two years later in order that their daughter might marry Prince Maximillian of Hohenlohe. Together, they were the parents of:

 Helene "Nelly" Susanne Pauline Hubertine Luise von Hatzfeldt (3 March 1865 – 21 May 1901), who married Max Anthon Karl von Hohenlohe-Öhringen (1860–1922), a son of Prince Hugo zu Hohenlohe-Öhringen and grandson of August, Prince of Hohenlohe-Öhringen.
 Paul "Hermann" Karl Hubert von Hatzfeldt (30 July 1867 – 12 June 1941), a diplomat who married Baroness Maria von Stumm (1882–1954).
 "Marie" Augusta Cesarinne Melanie von Hatzfeldt (10 January 1871 – 15 April 1932), who married Friedrich Karl von Hohenlohe-Öhringen (1855–1910), brother of her sister's husband.

Count von Hatzfeldt died in London on 22 November 1901. In 1910, his son inherited the title and properties of Paul's nephew, Prince Franz von Hatzfeldt-Wildenburg.

Honours
He received the following orders and decorations:

Sources 
Hermann von Eckardstein.  Lebenserinnerungen u. Politische Denkwürdigkeiten.  Leipzig: Verlag Paul List, 1919.
 Vera Niehus: Ein »ambassadeur idéal«, jedoch »den Anstrengungen des ministeriellen Dienstes nicht gewachsen«: Paul von Hatzfeldt als außenpolitischer Mitarbeiter Bismarcks. In: Lothar Gall, Ulrich Lappenküper (Hrsg.): Bismarcks Mitarbeiter. Schöningh, Paderborn 2009, .
 Franz-Eugen Volz: Paul Graf von Hatzfeldt-Wildenburg. In: Lebensbilder aus dem Kreis Altenkirchen. Altenkirchen, 1975.

References
Notes

Sources

External links
 

1831 births
1901 deaths
Nobility from Düsseldorf
House of Hatzfeld
Foreign Secretaries of Germany
Ambassadors of Germany to Spain
Ambassadors of Germany to the United Kingdom
Ambassadors of Germany to Turkey
Recipients of the Iron Cross (1870), 2nd class
Knights Grand Cross of the Order of Saints Maurice and Lazarus
Recipients of the Order of the Crown (Italy)
Knights of Malta
Knights of the Order of the Netherlands Lion
Grand Crosses of the Order of the Star of Romania
Recipients of the Order of the White Eagle (Russia)
Recipients of the Order of the Cross of Takovo